H. Leh & Co. (or simply Leh's) was a department store located at 626 West Hamilton Street in Allentown, Pennsylvania. It was of what was an outside mall structure called the Hamilton Mall. Like many other downtown department stores of the time, however, it ultimately closed as suburban shopping malls' increased in popularity.

History
Born in Allentown in 1830, on April 25, 1850, Henry Leh, hung a sign at 626 Hamilton Street in Allentown. He would sell ready-to-wear clothes to the 4,000 citizens of Allentown, something that was unheard of in that part of the state. And if they needed boots and shoes, he'd not only sell them but make them. The building was a four-story building, of which the upper three floors consisted of Leh's manufacturing factory. The ground floor was Leh's retail store.

The early years were not easy for the retail store he first named Neleigh & Leh. Leh had to get all of his merchandise by canal boat and stagecoach. Then there was the problem of business partners. He had several between 1850 and 1860. And in the latter part of the 1850s, the nation was trying to recover from a depression.

It was the Civil War that changed Leh's fortunes. The Union Army needed boots. Since Simon Cameron, the secretary of war, was from Pennsylvania, many government contracts flowed to the Keystone state. With a contract to make boots, Leh was able to put the store on a sound fiscal footing. During the Civil War, Leh had a manufacturing payroll of about 175 people, with sixty to sixty-five machines in constant use. He manufactured about 500 pairs of boots and shoes each day. He also expanded his business to include the stores at 628 and 630 Hamilton.

As Allentown prospered in the post-Civil War era, so did Henry Leh. The store was already well established in 1874 when a young man named Horatio Koch got a job there as a shipping clerk.  Koch quickly advanced in the company. Shortly thereafter, Koch married Leh's daughter, Sallie to join the two families and soon became a partner in Leh's Department Store. Horatio's brothers, Frank and Thomas Koch opened the Koch Brothers men's clothing store on the main floor of the Hotel Allen on the northeast corner of Center Square. The relationship between the Leh's, the Kochs and retailing on Hamilton Street continued when Horatio's nephew, William Koch, opened his own store on the southwest corner of Center Square. Originally called the Stillwagon Store, it was later named Koch & Person in 1905. It remained in bushiness until 1920 when it closed and was demolished in order to make way for the new Merchants National Bank building. With the Center Square store closing, Pearson's retired and the business became the Will Koch Clothing store in the 900 block of Hamilton until closing in the 1930s due to the depression. The Koch Brothers store at the Hotel Allen remained in business until 1954, taking over the entire building when the hotel went out of business in 1947.

At the 1876 Centennial Exposition in Philadelphia, Leh had a display of men's and women's boots and shoes that his manufacturing plant produced. The judges at the Exposition noted that it was "A good exhibit of Women's, Misses and Children's heavy and substantial shoes, prime stock and workmanship, and good, full fitting and strong work. The heavy mining boot, borgan and buckle shoe are very superior articles for purposes intended.  Prices of goods were very reasonable".

In the 1880s,  the store had expanded far beyond selling shoes. Dry goods were added along with fabrics,  ready to wear clothing and other goods, turning the company into a department store.   In April 1880, the Reliable Lion Clothing Store was purchased on the southeast corner of 7th and Hamilton which became the H. M. Leh Lion Clothing Store selling ready-to-wear clothing.  The Lion Hall Clothing was sold in the summer of 1895 and became Dresher & Stephens Lion Clothing Store, and subsequently in 1898 into Shankweiler and Lehr, which operated as men's store into the 1980s.

By Henry Leh's death in 1910, his sons and the Kochs were already making plans to modernize the store. In 1911, the newly remodeled H. Leh & Co. store reopened. It was a bright modern building worthy of the new century in which it was born. The building had a fourth floor added to it and a new facade facing Hamilton Street. It was the first of several expansions of the downtown building over the next 50 years.  It later acquired three buildings at 25/27/29 south Seventh Street and integrated it into the main store, giving it an "L" shape. In 1931, the former Tallman's Cafe at 632 Hamilton was purchased and the store again expanded, while also adding a new, modern facade while expanding the store. When H. Leh & Co. celebrated its 100th anniversary in 1950, it was considered as solid a local institution as its neighbor, Zion's Reformed UCC Church, known as the hiding place of the Liberty Bell during the American Revolution.

Christmas season found the store packed. The arrival of Santa Claus was a major event. The jolly old elf showed up on every kind of land and aircraft imaginable. Although not quite as flamboyant as Max Hess's showplace at 9th and Hamilton, Leh's still held its own. In the late 1950s an appearance by pop singing idol Frankie Avalon packed the store with teen-agers.

But by the late 1960s, the arrival of the suburban mall was already starting to hurt downtown stores. To keep its customers, Leh's countered by building a large parking deck in 1970. Leh's peak came in the late 1980s, when it brought in $25 million in its retail sales over the course of the year. At that point, it ranked among the nation's top 100 department stores.

Expansion

Leh's also had locations, all of which closed, at:
Bethlehem Square, Bethlehem, Pennsylvania (1988-1996)
Quakertown, Pennsylvania  (1972-1996)
Whitehall Mall, Whitehall Township, Pennsylvania, taking over the bankrupt Zollinger and Harned store (1978-1996).  Now Gold's Gym and buybuy BABY.

Also, after Leh's closing, remaining merchandise was sold at:
Leh's Close-Outs & More, S 4th Street, Allentown

Decline
After its peak, a serious decline in downtown Allentown's economic fortunes led to the sale of Hess's to The Bon-Ton in 1994.  In 1994, Leh's flagship store closed for good. Two years later, Bon-Ton closed the flagship at 9th and Hamilton Streets, putting an end to the era of the department store in downtown Allentown. The five-story Leh's building was renovated and is now used by Lehigh County. On June 29, 1996, all of the remaining locations closed.

Historical timeline
Leh's Department Store, Timeline 1850-1996

 April 25, 1850—Henry Leh opens store on Hamilton Street, Allentown. That same year, he starts producing shoes and boots.
 1861-1865—Leh gets contract to make boots for the Union Army during Civil War.
 1884—Horatio B. Koch becomes a partner and marries Leh's daughter Sallie.
 1898—Leh supplies boots to U.S. Army during Spanish–American War.
 1910—Henry Leh dies.
 1911—Newly expanded H. Leh & Company store reopens. Shoe and boot making factory closes.
 1920—Horatio B. Koch dies.
 1928—Store undergoes major expansion.
 1936—Store expands again despite Great Depression.
 1950—Store marks 100th anniversary. John Leh II and H. Thomas Koch Jr., great grandsons of Henry Leh, join company.
 1970—Leh's opens parking deck.
 1972—Leh's opens first satellite store in Quakertown.
 1978—Leh's opens Whitehall Mall store, taking over the bankrupt Zollinger-Harned store established in 1966.
 1988—Third satellite store opens in Bethlehem.
 1992—Co-owners John Leh II and William Leh buy out the co-founding Koch family's interest.
 1994—Leh's closes Allentown store.
 March 11, 1996—William Leh announces closing of remaining department stores.

See also
 Zollinger and Harned
 Hess Brothers
 List of historic places in Allentown, Pennsylvania

References

Defunct department stores based in Pennsylvania
Clothing retailers of the United States
Defunct companies based in Pennsylvania
History of Allentown, Pennsylvania
Buildings and structures in Lehigh County, Pennsylvania
Buildings and structures in Allentown, Pennsylvania
1850 establishments in Pennsylvania
1996 disestablishments in Pennsylvania